

The Alfried Krupp von Bohlen und Halbach Foundation is a major German philanthropic foundation, created by and named in honor of Alfried Krupp von Bohlen und Halbach, former owner and head of the Krupp company and a convicted war criminal. 

The Krupp company, officially known as Friedrich Krupp AG Hoesch-Krupp, was a major steelmaker and arms manufacturer that became a key supplier of weapons and materiel to the German government and the Wehrmacht during World War II. The "Krupp Law" (Lex Krupp), signed into law by Adolf Hitler in 1943, allowed Alfried Krupp to become sole proprietor of the company. The Krupp company instituted slave labor at its factories and by the end of World War II had forcibly employed as many as 100,000 individuals, including concentration camp inmates, foreign civilians and children. A Krupp munitions factory (Weichsel Union Metallwerke) was constructed near the Auschwitz death camp to facilitate the employment of camp inmates.

Beginning in 1947, a United States military tribunal tried Krupp and 11 co-defendants for war crimes and crimes against humanity, citing in particular the use of forced labor in their factories (the "Krupp trial"). On 31 July 1948, Krupp was convicted and sentenced to 12 years in prison. After serving three years, he was pardoned by John J. McCloy, the U.S. High Commissioner for Germany, and his properties were reinstated.

In 1959, the Krupp company pledged to pay individual compensations of DM5,000 ($1,190) to 2,000 slave workers (2% of all the estimated 100,000 slave workers), totalling DM10,000,000 (US$2,380,000). Adjusted for inflation, this corresponds to approximately €23.7 million or US$27.1 million in 2022. The company denied non-Jewish inmates of the concentration camps any claim to compensation. 

After Krupp's death in 1967, control of the Krupp company passed to the Alfried Krupp von Bohlen und Halbach Foundation, a philanthropic organisation, at Krupp's behest. Today, the foundation is the largest shareholder of the ThyssenKrupp industrial conglomerate (20.9% as of 2018) and largely controls the board of the company. The foundation is also tasked with preserving the "unity" of ThyssenKrupp.

The foundation provides grants in the fields of health, athletics, education, science and culture.

Other institutions named after the Alfried Krupp

 , Essen
 Alfried Krupp Institute for Advanced Study, Greifswald, Germany
 Alfried Krupp PhD Grant
 
 Alfried Krupp Street, Essen, Germany

See also
Holocaust victims
List of companies involved in the Holocaust
List of victims and survivors of Auschwitz

References

External links 
Alfried Krupp von Bohlen und Halbach Foundation
Krupp Armaments at Auschwitz

Companies involved in the Holocaust
Crimes against humanity
Foundations based in Germany
International criminal law
Krupp
ThyssenKrupp
Torture
War crimes